R. japonica  may refer to:
 Rana japonica, the Japanese brown frog, a frog species endemic to Japan
 Ranzania japonica, a perennial herb species native to Honshū, Japan
 Rhabdomastix japonica, a crane fly species in the genus Rhabdomastix
 Rhamnus japonica, the Japanese buckthorn, a plant species in the genus Rhamnus
 Rhomborrhina japonica, the drone beetle, a large beetle species
 Rickettsia japonica, a bacterium species that causes the Japanese spotted fever
 Rohdea japonica, the Nippon lily, sacred lily or Japanese sacred lily, a flowering plant species native from southwestern China to Japan
 Roussoellopsis japonica, a fungus species

Synonyms
 Reynoutria japonica, a synonym for Fallopia japonica, the Japanese knotweed, a large herbaceous perennial plant species native to Japan, China and Korea

See also
 Japonica (disambiguation)